Guillaume de Lorris (c. 1200c. 1240) was a French scholar and poet from Lorris. He was the author of the first section of the Roman de la Rose. Little is known about him, other than that he wrote the earlier section of the poem around 1230, and that the work was completed forty years later by Jean de Meun. He is only known by mention of Jean de Meun, (de Meung in French), in ''Roman de la Rose''.

Lorris' poem was translated into Middle English verse by Chaucer, and into Modern English verse by F. S. Ellis.

References

External links 
 
 
Roman de la Rose Digital Library
Roman de la Rose From the Rare Book and Special Collections Division at the Library of Congress
Cest le Romant de la rose  From the Rare Book and Special Collections Division at the Library of Congress
 Roman de la rose at Somni

1200s births
1240s deaths
Year of birth uncertain
Year of death uncertain
13th-century French writers
French fantasy writers
French male poets
13th-century French poets